Rufanula sextula is a species of sea snail, a marine gastropod mollusk, in the family Liotiidae.

Distribution
The species occurs in South Africa.

References

Liotiidae